Goldenrod is a census-designated place (CDP) in Orange and Seminole counties in the U.S. state of Florida.  The population was 12,039 at the 2010 census. It is part of the Orlando–Kissimmee–Sanford, Florida Metropolitan Statistical Area.

Geography

According to the United States Census Bureau, the CDP has a total area of 7.0 km (2.7 mi²), of which 6.7 km (2.6 mi²) is land and 0.3 km (0.1 mi²) (4.78%) is water.

Demographics

At the 2000 census there were 12,871 people, 5,398 households, and 3,152 families living in the CDP.  The population density was 1,918.7/km (4,963.2/mi²).  There were 5,575 housing units at an average density of 831.1/km (2,149.8/mi²).  The racial makeup of the CDP was 82.43% White, 5.53% African American, 0.47% Native American, 2.86% Asian, 0.09% Pacific Islander, 5.38% from other races, and 3.25% from two or more races. Hispanic or Latino of any race were 17.83%.

Of the 5,398 households 26.2% had children under the age of 18 living with them, 42.6% were married couples living together, 11.1% had a female householder with no husband present, and 41.6% were non-families. 28.5% of households were one person and 5.5% were one person aged 65 or older.  The average household size was 2.37 and the average family size was 2.98.

The age distribution was 21.4% under the age of 18, 14.6% from 18 to 24, 33.8% from 25 to 44, 20.0% from 45 to 64, and 10.2% 65 or older.  The median age was 32 years. For every 100 females, there were 103.1 males.  For every 100 females age 18 and over, there were 101.7 males.

The median household income was $41,173 and the median family income was $47,570. Males had a median income of $32,177 versus $25,425 for females. The per capita income for the CDP was $19,830.  About 6.6% of families and 10.9% of the population were below the poverty line, including 10.1% of those under age 18 and 4.1% of those age 65 or over.

References

Census-designated places in Seminole County, Florida
Census-designated places in Orange County, Florida
Greater Orlando
Census-designated places in Florida